This is a list of Villanova Wildcats in the NFL Draft.

Key

Selections

References

Villanova

Villanova Wildcats NFL Draft